Waukesha South High School is one of three high schools located in Waukesha, Wisconsin. It was opened in 1957 as a southern campus to Waukesha High School, then in downtown Waukesha. The downtown campus is now Les Paul Middle School - Central Campus.

History

Waukesha South High School Shooting 
On December 2, 2019, a school shooting took place in which a student armed with a pellet gun was wounded by a police officer.

Heavy Police Presence at Waukesha South 
On December 2–3, 2021, almost two weeks after the Waukesha Christmas Parade Tragedy, there was a heavy police presence at Waukesha South due to physical altercations between students. This situation was immediately responded by school faculty and administration, as well as the Waukesha Police Department. In addition to the police presence on Friday, there was also a staggered evacuation at Waukesha West High School due to an online threat to students during the lunch period.

Extra-curricular activities 
Waukesha South is one of three schools whose students participate in CORE 2062, a FIRST Robotics Competition team. The team won the Rookie All Star Award in 2007, the Wisconsin Regional (Milwaukee) in 2008, and the 10,000 Lakes Regional (Minneapolis) in 2010. In 2008, they also won the World Safety Award, the Wisconsin Regional Safety Award, the St. Louis Safety Award, the Entrepreneurship Award, the Website Award, in 2009 they won two Safety Awards, two Quality Awards, and an Animation Award. In 2015 CORE 2062 won regionals twice and made it to the FIRST World Championship in St. Louis. In 2019 they won the Chairman's Award, the most prestigious award in FIRST Robotics Competition and attended the world championships in Detroit.

Waukesha South's mock trial team won the state championship in 2021 and placed 13th at the National High School Mock Trial Tournament.

The Blackshirt Student Newspaper, or The Blackshirt, is an online student-run school newspaper. Founded in 2017 by a couple of students, the student-run publication has gone on to complete interviews with Olympic Athlete Whitney Ashley and Max Temkin, a Forbes 30 Under 30 alumn & cofounder of the popular card game Cards Against Humanity.

The Academic Decathlon team took 3rd place in state competition in 2011 and was 1st among Division 1 schools.

Waukesha South's novice debate team placed seventh at state in 2010 and one of its members, Sam Foat, won Top Negative Speaker. South also had a Lincoln-Douglas debater qualify individually. The forensics team had all but one member qualify for state in 2011 and all achieved high honors.

In September 2011 South restarted Key Club. It is an avid volunteer group throughout the community with about 50 members. They have helped out with many charity events throughout the community including Apple Harvest Festival, Waukesha Artful Bowls, Minooka Mash, and Salvation Army bell ringing. As the school year progresses Waukesha South Key Club plans on having many more volunteer projects ahead.

Waukesha South also has a Mock Trial team, which advanced to the State competition in 2019 as the runner-up in their region. They placed third in their region in 2020, but no State competition was held that year due to the COVID-19 pandemic. In their virtual 2021 season, they had gone undefeated and advanced to the National Mock Trial Championship, where they placed 13th in the country. In the 2022 season, they placed 5th at State after coming 1st in their region.

Athletics
South is a member of the Classic 8 Conference for most athletics. South's boys' swim team won the state championship in 2010, 2011, and 2017, and placed second in 2020. The girls' swim team won the state championships in 2011, 2012, and 2013, and placed third at the state meet in 2009 and second in 2010.

Waukesha South's sports include:

Baseball
Basketball (boys and girls}
Cheerleading
Cross country (boys and girls)
Dance team
Diving (boys and girls)
Football
Gymnastics (co-op team with West and North)
Ice hockey (boys and girls, co-op teams with North, West and Kettle Moraine (girls)
Lacrosse (boys and girls, co-op team with West and North)
Soccer (boys and girls)
Softball
Swimming (boys and girls, co-op teams with CMH (boys) and Mukwonago (girls)
Tennis (boys and girls)
Track & field (boys and girls)
Volleyball (boys and girls)
Wrestling
Waukesha South athletes, coaches, and fans won the Classic 8 Sportsmanship Award in 2015, 2016, and 2017.

Bands
Waukesha South's Bands, the Waukesha South Blackshirt Bands, include Concert, Wind & Symphonic, Jazz, Marching, and several ensembles. The band curriculum focuses on music performance and music theory. The bands travel to local, domestic, and international venues.  Locations have included Switzerland in 1974; England in 1998; New Orleans, Texas, and Florida in 2009; England, California, and Australia in 2011; and China in 2007.

Orchestras
Waukesha South's Orchestras include two skill levels; Symphony, and Chamber. Both orchestras work together to focus on music theory, performance etiquette and musical technique in solo and ensemble performance. Orchestra performances periodically involve winds, brass, and percussion instruments to create a full symphony orchestra. The string players perform together within the community to boost awareness of the musical program. Community gigs includes partnership performances with the Waukesha Public Library, and an annual Flash Mob on opening night of Downtown Waukesha's Friday Night Live.

The full Waukesha South Orchestra performed in collaboration with Milwaukee band, I'm Not A Pilot in May 2015. The full Waukesha South Orchestra and indie rock band played a total of eight original I'm Not A Pilot songs written by band members Mark Glatzel, Adrian Esguerra, Peter Thomas, and Steve Vorass Jr. with orchestral scores arranged by Jim Gray.

Notable alumni 
 John Anderson, former Green Bay Packer and one-time sports announcer on Channel 6-Milwaukee, now FOX 6-Milwaukee
 Frank Caliendo, former MADtv star and impressionist
 Will Durst, political satirist and stand-up comic
 Morgan Hamm, Olympic Silver Medalist in gymnastics
 Paul Hamm, Olympic Gold Medalist in gymnastics
 Erinn Lobdell, TV show contestant on former Survivor: Tocantins
 Mark Mallman, rock pianist
 Kurt Neumann, Sam Llanas, and Bob Griffin of BoDeans
 Gwen Jorgenson, triathlete and Olympic Gold Medalist
 Nik Rettinger, Wisconsin state legislator
 Michelle Thaller, astronomer and assistant director for Science Communication at NASA
 BoDeans musical group

References

External links
 Waukesha South High School

Educational institutions established in 1957
Public high schools in Wisconsin
Schools in Waukesha County, Wisconsin
1957 establishments in Wisconsin